This is a list of the mammal species recorded in Bermuda. Of the mammal species in Bermuda, one is endangered and one is vulnerable.

The following tags are used to highlight each species' conservation status as assessed by the International Union for Conservation of Nature:

Order: Chiroptera (bats) 
The bats' most distinguishing feature is that their forelimbs are developed as wings, making them the only mammals capable of flight. Bat species account for about 20% of all mammals.

Family: Vespertilionidae
Subfamily: Myotinae
Genus: Lasionycteris
 Silver-haired bat, L. noctivagans LC
Subfamily: Vespertilioninae
Genus: Lasiurus
 Eastern red bat, Lasiurus borealis LR/lc
 Hoary bat, Lasiurus cinereus LR/lc

Order: Cetacea (whales) 

The order Cetacea includes whales, dolphins and porpoises. They are the mammals most fully adapted to aquatic life with a spindle-shaped nearly hairless body, protected by a thick layer of blubber, and forelimbs and tail modified to provide propulsion underwater.

Suborder: Mysticeti
Family: Balaenidae
Genus: Eubalaena
 North Atlantic right whale, Eubalaena glacialis EN
Family: Balaenopteridae
Genus: Balaenoptera
 Common minke whale, Balaenoptera acutorostrata LC
 Sei whale, Balaenoptera borealis EN
 Bryde's whale, Balaenoptera brydei DD
 Blue whale, Balaenoptera musculus EN
 Fin whale, Balaenoptera physalus EN
Subfamily: Megapterinae
Genus: Megaptera
 Humpback whale, Megaptera novaeangliae VU
Suborder: Odontoceti
Superfamily: Platanistoidea
Family: Delphinidae (marine dolphins)
Genus: Lagenodelphis
 Fraser's dolphin, Lagenodelphis hosei DD
Genus: Grampus
 Risso's dolphin, Grampus griseus DD
Genus: Globicephala
 Short-finned pilot whale, Globicephala macrorhynchus DD
 Long-finned pilot whale, Globicephala melas DD
Genus: Orcinus
 Killer whale, Orcinus orca DD
Genus: Feresa
 Pygmy killer whale, Feresa attenuata DD
Genus: Stenella
 Pantropical spotted dolphin, Stenella attenuata LC
 Clymene dolphin, Stenella clymene DD
 Striped dolphin, Stenella coeruleoalba LC
 Atlantic spotted dolphin, Stenella frontalis DD
 Spinner dolphin, Stenella longirostris DD
Genus: Tursiops
 Common bottlenose dolphin, Tursiops truncatus LC
Family: Physeteridae
Genus: Physeter
 Sperm whale, Physeter catodon VU
Family: Kogiidae
Genus: Kogia
 Pygmy sperm whale, Kogia breviceps DD
 Dwarf sperm whale, Kogia sima DD
Family: Ziphiidae
Genus: Mesoplodon
 Blainville's beaked whale, Mesoplodon bidens DD
 Gervais' beaked whale, Mesoplodon europaeus DD
 True's beaked whale, Mesoplodon mirus DD
Genus: Ziphius
 Cuvier's beaked whale, Ziphius cavirostris DD

Notes

References

See also
List of chordate orders
Lists of mammals by region
List of prehistoric mammals
Mammal classification
List of mammals described in the 2000s

Bermuda
Mammals
'
Bermuda